KBS World is a Japanese television channel operated by KBS Japan, a subsidiary of the Korean Broadcasting System, targeting Koreans in Japan, as well as Japanese audience interested in Korean entertainment. Launched on April 1, 2006, KBS World broadcasts in Korean language with Japanese subtitles most of time.

Unlike other KBS World variants rest of the world, it is also available in HD.

References

External links 
 

World Japan
Television networks in Japan
Zainichi Korean culture
Korean-language television stations
Television channels and stations established in 2006